Nubar Terziyan (born Nubar Alyanak, 16 March 1909 – 14 January 1994) was a Turkish–Armenian actor.

Biography 
Of Armenian descent, Nubar Terziyan was born in March 1909 in Istanbul. He went to Bezazyan Ermeni Lisesi (Bezazyan Armenian Lyceum)  in Bakırköy. In 1940 he began his acting career and in 1949 had his first major role in an adaptation of  Hüseyin Rahmi Gürpınar's Efsuncu Baba. He acted in hundreds of films and several TV shows. He died at the age of 84 on 14 January 1994 and is buried at the Balıklı cemetery in Istanbul.

Selected filmography 

 Efsuncu Baba (1949) .... Agop
 İstanbul Çiçekleri (1951)
 İstanbul'un Fethi (1951)
 Ankara Ekspresi (1952)
 Iki kafadar deliler pansiyonunda (1952)
 İngiliz Kemal Lawrense Karşı (1952) .... Villager
 Kanun namına (1952) .... Kamil
 Kızıltuğ - Cengiz Han (1952)
 Salgın (1952)
 Edi ile Büdü Tiyatrocu (1952)
 Edi ile Büdü (1953)
 Soygun (1953)
 Öldüren sehir (1953) .... Osman
 Katil (1953) .... Nuri
 Bulgar Sadik (1954)
 Son Baskın (1954)
 Kaçak (1954)
 Beyaz Cehennem (1954) .... Baskomiser Hamdi
 Oyuncu kiz (1955)
 Meçhul kadin (1955)
 İlk ve Son (1955)
 Gün dogarken (1955)
 Dağları Bekleyen Kız (1955)
 Artık Çok Geç (1955)
 Disi yila (1956)
 Zeynebin İntikamı (1956)
 Piç (1956)
 Kalbimin sarkisi (1956) .... Doktor
 İntikam Alevi (1956)
 Beş Hasta Var (1956)
 Bir Avuç Toprak (1957)
 Berdus (1957)
 Kumpanya (1958)
  (1958)
 Beraber Ölelim (1958)
 Ömrümün Tek Gecesi (1959)
 Kırık Plak (1959)
 Kalpaklılar (1959)
 Izmir Atesler Içinde (1959)
 Gurbet (1959)
 Düşman Yolları Kesti (1959) .... Ethem Bey
 Cilali Ibo yildizlar arasinda (1959)
 Talihsiz Yavru (1960)
 Satın Alınan Adam (1960) .... Selim
 Yeşil Köşkün Lambası (1960)
 Rüzgar Zehra (1960)
 Kırık Kalpler (1960)
  (1960)
 Güzeller resmigeçidi (1960)
 Dolandırıcılar Şahı (1960)
 Civanmert (1960)
 Aşktan da Üstün (1960)
 Aliii (1960)
 Allah Cezanı Versin Osman Bey (1961)
 İki Aşk Arasında (1961)
 Mahalleye Gelen Gelin (1961)
 Unutamadigim kadin (1961)
 Sokaktan gelen kadin (1961)
 Şafakta Buluşalım (1961)
 Özleyiş (1961)
 Küçük Hanımefendi (1961)
 Ekmek Parası (1962)
 Ayşecik Yavru Melek (1962) .... Seref - Doktor
 Erkeklik öldü mü Atif Bey (1962)
 Ver Elini İstanbul (1962)
 Sokak Kızı (1962)
 Külhan Aşkı (1962)
 Küçük Hanımın Şoförü (1962)
 Küçük Hanım Avrupa'da (1962)
 Kıyma Bana Güzelim (1962)
 Hayat Bazen Tatlıdır (1962)
 Cilalı İbo Rüyalar Aleminde (1962)
 Bosver doktor (1962)
 Biz de Arkadaş mıyız? (1962)
 Zorla evlendik (1963) .... Avukat Ardas
 Yaralı Aslan (1963)
 Kin (1963) .... Savci
 Kendini arayan adam (1963)
 Kelepçeli Aşk (1963)
 Kahpe (1963)
 İki Gemi Yanyana (1963)
 Hop Dedik (1963)
 Cinayet gecesi (1963)
 Cilali Ibo kadin avcisi (1963)
 Bütün suçumuz sevmek (1963)
 Bazilari dayak sever (1963)
 Barut Fıçısı (1963)
 Badem Şekeri (1963)
 Arka Sokaklar (1963)
 Adanalı Tayfur (1963)
 Hızır Dede (1964) .... Babalik
 Kral Arkadaşım (1964)
 Affetmeyen Kadın (1964)
 Yılların Ardından (1964)
 Tophaneli Osman (1964)
 Ölüm Allah'in emri (1964)
 Macera Kadını (1964)
 Koçum Benim (1964)
 Kimse Fatma Gibi Öpemez (1964)
 Katilin Kızı (1964)
 Kara dagli efe (1964)
 Cehennem arkadaslari (1964) .... Murat
 Abidik Gubidik (1964)
 Şaka ile Karışık (1965)
 The Bread Seller Woman (1965)
 Prangalı Şehzade (1965) .... Udî
 Seven Kadın Unutmaz (1965)
 Uzakta Kal Sevgilim (1965)
 Tatlı Yumruk (1965)
 Tamirci Parçası (1965)
 Şeytanın Kurbanları (1965)
 Sevinç Gözyaşları (1965)
 Şeker Hafiye (1965)
 Satılık Kalp (1965)
 Sana Layık Değilim (1965)
 Komşunun Tavuğu (1965)
 Kartallarin öcü: Severek ölenler.. (1965)
 Fakir Gencin Romanı (1965)
 Elveda Sevgilim (1965)
 Bekri Mustafa (1965)
 Efkârlıyım Abiler (1966)
 Vur Emri (1966) .... Prison officer
 Geceler Yarim Oldu (1966)
 Babam Katil Değildi (1966)
 Suçsuz Firari (1966)
 Siyah Gül (1966)
 Seher Vakti (1966)
 Meleklerin İntikamı (1966)
 Kenarın Dilberi (1966)
 Kara Tren (1966)
 İdam Mahkumu (1966)
 Fakir çocuklar (1966)
 Düğün Gecesi (1966)
 Beyoğlu Esrarı (1966)
 Ayrılık Şarkısı (1966)
 Avare Kız (1966)
 Akşam Güneşi (1966) .... Halil
 Affet Sevgilim (1966)
 Aci tesadüf (1966)
 Deli Fişek (1967)
 Zehirli Çiçek (1967)
 Yarın Çok Geç Olacak (1967)
 Silahli pasazade (1967)
 Serseriler krali (1967)
 Sefiller (1967)
 Ölümsüz Kadın (1967)
 Kelepçeli Melek (1967)
 Kardeş Kavgası (1967)
 Kara Duvaklı Gelin (1967)
 Ilk askim (1967)
 Hırçın Kadın (1967)
 Çifte Tabancalı Damat (1967)
 Cici Gelin (1967)
 Bekâr Odası (1967)
 Ayrılık Saati (1967)
 Aşkım Günahımdır (1967)
 Aksamci (1967)
 Aga düsen kadin (1967)
 Aşka Tövbe (1968) (1968)
 Cilali Ibo Istanbul Kaldirimlarinda (1968)
 Yayla kartali (1968)
 Urfa-Istanbul (1968) .... Cebbar
 Tahran Macerası (1968)
 Sevemez Kimse Seni (1968)
 Sabah Yıldızı (1968)
 Paydos (1968)
 Kâtip (1968)
 İngiliz Kemal'in Oğlu (1968)
 Gül ve Şeker (1968)
 Funda (1968)
 Dertli Pınar (1968)
 Benim de Kalbim Var (1968)
 Ana Hakkı Ödenmez (1968)
 Son Mektup (1969)
 Dağlar Kızı Reyhan (1969) .... Mahkum
 Osmanlı Kartalı (1969) .... İmamoğlu's father
 Ömercik babasinin oglu (1969)
 Kapıcının Kızı (1969)
 İki yetime (1969)
 Hüzünlü ask (1969)
 Hayat Kavgası (1969)
 Hanci (1969) .... Polis
 Galatalı Fatma (1969)
 Çingene Aşkı Paprika (1969)
 Boş Çerçeve (1969) .... Avni
 Besikteki miras (1969)
 Batakli damin kizi Aysel (1969)
 Ağlama Değmez Hayat (1969)
 Aysel Bataklı Damın Kızı (1969)
 Zeyno (1970)
 Yuvasiz kuslar (1970)
 Yumurcak köprüalti çocugu (1970)
 Yılan Kadın (1970)
 Tatli melegim (1970)
 Tatlı Hayal (1970)
 Son Kızgın Adam (1970)
 Son Günah (1970) .... Fahri, police chief
 Seven Ne Yapmaz (1970)
 Paralı Askerler (1970)
 Öleceksek ölelim (1970)
 Küçük Hanımefendi (1970) .... Feridun
 İşler Karışık (1970)
 Erkeklik Öldü mü Abiler (1970)
 Cilalı İbo Avrupa'da (1970)
 Bütün Aşklar Tatlı Başlar (1970)
 Birleşen Yollar (1970)
 Ah Müjgan Ah (1970)
 Ağlayan Melek (1970)
 Cambazhane Gülü (1971)
 Ayibettin Semsettin (1971)
 Yumurcağın Tatlı Rüyaları (1971)
 Mistik (1971)
 Bir genç kizin romani (1971)
 Küçük sevgilim (1971)
 Üvey ana (1971)
 Unutulan Kadın (1971)
 Solan Bir Yaprak Gibi (1971)
 Sezercik yavrum benim (1971)
 Sevimli haydut (1971)
 Sevdiğim Uşak (1971)
 Satın Alınan Koca (1971) .... Hizir Baba
 Saraylar Meleği (1971)
 Ölmeyen Adam (1971)
 Kaçak (1971)
  (1971)
 Fatoş Sokakların Meleği (1971)
 Disi hedef (1971)
 Cilali Ibo yetimler melegi (1971)
 Cehenneme bir yolcu (1971)
 Bir kadin kayboldu (1971)
 Bir avuç kan (1971)
 Bebek Gibi Maşallah (1971)
 Ateş Parçası (1971)
 Melek mi, Şeytan mı? (1971) .... Abdullah
 Adini anmayacagim (1971)
 Cilalı İbo Teksas Fatihi (1972)
 Bir Pınar Ki (1972)
 Oyun Bitti (1972)
 Acı Kader (1972)
 Yirmi yil sonra (1972)
 Bin Bir Gece Masallari (1972)
 Ask ve cinayet melegi (1972)
  (1972) .... Mestan
 Sezercik aslan parcasi (1972)
 Fatma Bacı (1972)
 Ölümle Dudak Dudaga (1972)
 Vurma Zalim Vurma (1972)
 Tövbekâr (1972)
 Son duani et (1972)
 Mahkum (1972)
 Kopuk (1972)
 Kallesler (1972) .... Melek'in Babasi
 Kahpe tuzagi (1972) .... Sevket
 Kaderin esiriyiz (1972)
 Falci (1972)
 Evlat (1972)
 Çile (1972)
 Atmaca Mehmet (1972)
 Aslanlarin ölümü (1972)
 Kirik hayat (1973) .... Temel Reis
 Ekmekçi Kadin (1973)
 Kabadayinin sonu (1973) .... Arzu'nun Babasi
 Afacan Harika Çocuk (1973)
 Iki süngü arasinda (1973)
 Bataklik bülbülü (1973) .... Komiser
 Bir Garip Yolcu (1973) .... Judge
 Tatlım (1973) .... Kaptan
 Bir Demet Menekşe (1973) .... Yakup the jeweller
 Aşk Mahkumu (1973)
 7 evlât iki damat (1973) .... Mahmut
 Kara Sevda (1973)
 Karateci Kiz (1973) .... Zeynep's Father
 Yalanci Yarim (1973) .... Bahçivan Mestan
 Süphe (1973)
 Soyguncular (1973)
  (1973) .... Murat'in Dayisi
 Öksüzler (1973) .... Rasim the milkman
 İkibin Yılın Sevgilisi (1973)
 Güllü Geliyor Güllü (1973) .... Temel Reis
 Çilgin kiz ve üç süper adam (1973)
 Çaresizler (1973)
 Askimla oynama (1973)
 Arap Abdo (1973)
 Anneler Günü (1973)
 Anadolu ekspresi (1973) .... Osman Reis
 Askin Zaferi (1974)
 Kalles (1974)
 Çoban (1974)
 Kardesim (1974) .... Arif Baba
 Siginti (1974)
 Talihsizler (1974)
 Talihsiz yavrum (1974) .... Doktor Amca
 Erkeksen kaçma (1974) .... Hüseyin
 Düsmanlarim çatlasin (1974) .... Hakim
 Sahipsizler (1974)
 Yaz Bekarı (1974)
 Silemezler Gönlümden (1974)
 Sevmek (1974) .... Nikah Memuru
 Sensiz yasanmaz (1974) .... Udi
 Memleketim (1974) .... Ismail Efendi
 Kısmet (1974)
 Dayi (1974)
 Dayan oglum dayan (1974) .... Hülya'nin Babasi
 Ayrı Dünyalar (1974)
 Murder on the Orient Express (1974)
 Tasrali Kiz (1975)
 Mirasyediler (1975)
  (1975) .... Topkapi Sarayi Müdürü
 Bir ana bir kiz (1975)
 Delisin (1975)
 Oy Emine (1975)
 Saymadim Kaç Yil Oldu (1975)
 Eski Kurtlar (1975)
 Ah bu kadinlar (1975)
 Vur Davula Tokmagi (1975)
 Üç ahbap çavuslar (1975) .... Sakir
 Tatli sert (1975) .... Polis Sefi
 Sinifta senlik (1975) .... Ögretmen
 Onun hikayesi (1975)
 Nöri Gantar Ailesi (1975)
 Nereden çikti bu velet (1975)
 Kader yolculari (1975) .... Kadri Baba
 Gece Kusu Zehra (1975) .... Dösemeci
 Fistiklar (1975) .... Varyemez Hüsamettin
 Duyun beni (1975)
 Bunalim (1975)
 Bahti Karali Yarim (1975) .... Asçi Ali
 Ah Nerede (1975) .... Dünür
 Ah Bu Gençlik (1975) .... Salih Dayı
 Sevdalilar (1976)
 Perisan (1976)
 Sıralardaki Heyecan (1976)
 Kader baglayinca (1976) .... Faytoncu
 Gülsah küçük anne (1976) .... Esnaf
 Bodrum Hakimi (1976) .... Tevfik Efendi
 Ben sana mecburum (1976)
 Alev (1976) .... Doktor
 Ah bu gençlik (1976)
 Adana urfa bankasi (1976)
 Bizim Kız (1977)
 Tövbekar (1977)
 Yuvanin bekçileri (1977) .... Basri Baba
 Onu Kötü Vurdular (1977)
 Dila Hanım (1977).... Osman Emmi the miller
 Aslan Bacanak (1977) .... Doctor
 Sen Ask Nedir Bilir misin (1978)
 Vahşi Gelin (1978) .... Necmiye's father
 Kara Murat Devler Savaşıyor (1978)
 Kadinlar kogusu (1978)
 İyi Aile Çocuğu (1978) .... Kemal'in Babasi
 Çilekeş (1978)
 Dertli Pinar (1979)
 Ne Olacak Şimdi (1979) .... Judge
 Mukaddes vazife (1979)
 Insan sevince (1979)
 Canikom (1979)
 Beddua (1980) .... Müzik Hocasi
 Zübük (1980)
 Havar (1980)
 Durdurun dünyayi (1980)
 Topragin teri (1981)
 Saka yapma (1981) .... Metin'in Babasi
 Kördüğüm (1982)
 Yakilacak kadin (1982)
 Islak mendil (1982)
 Çayda çira (1982)
 Aşkların En Güzeli (1982)
 Zifaf (1983) .... Kenan'in Babasi Tahir
 Yildizlarda kayar (1983) .... Asim Baba
 Küçük Ağa (1983, TV Mini-Series) .... Dr. Minas
 Kalbimdeki aci (1983) .... Nuri Baba
 Beyaz Ölüm (1983) .... Ihsan Dayi
 Postaci (1984)
 Nefret (1984)
 Lodos Zühtü (1984) .... Zühtü'nün Babasi
 Dağınık Yatak (1984)
 Birkaç Güzel Gün İçin (1984)
 Yavru Kus (1985)
 Keriz (1985)
 Kanun adami (1985) .... Sevket Baba
 Ikizler (1985)
 Güldür yüzümü (1985) .... Tahir Baba
 Gözlerden Kalbe (1985)
 Sevda rüzgari (1986) .... Hikmet Ziya
 Kader rüzgari (1986) .... Sirri Baba
 Hapishane gülü (1986)
 Dökülen Yapraklar (1987)
 Gönülden Gönüle (1988)
 Biz Ayrılamayız (1988)
 Çingene (1989) .... (final film orle)
 Aşk Filmlerinin Unutulmaz Yönetmeni (1990) .... Himself

Popular culture 
Nubar Terziyan was mentioned in a song by famed Turkish singer Sezen Aksu called "Kırık Vals" (Broken Waltz) in her Deniz Yıldızı (Starfish) album.

References

External links
 Movie Database Filmography of Nubar Terziyan on the Internet Movie Database.

1909 births
1994 deaths
Male actors from Istanbul
Turkish male film actors
Ethnic Armenian male actors
Turkish male television actors
20th-century Turkish male actors
Turkish people of Armenian descent
Burials at Şişli Armenian Cemetery